The Banat Highland Germans are an ethnic German sub-group which is part of the Banat Swabians (and the broader Danube Swabian group) who have been living in the mountainous part of the Banat, corresponding to Caraș-Severin County situated in present-day south-western Romania (and to a smaller extent Serbia as well). They are part of the Romanian Germans.

Background 

The Banat Highland Germans are a mixture of various German-speaking settlers from Salzkammergut (contemporary Austria), South Tyrol (contemporary northern Italy), Bohemian Forest (contemporary Czech Republic), and Bavarian Forest (including the historical region of Swabia). There were also Zipser colonists in the mountainous Banat. Consequently, they speak a certain series of different German dialects than the Banat Swabians in the lowlands of Banat, hence the differentiation in their name based on altitude or elevation.

History 

The Banat Highland Germans constituted themselves as an ethnic German sub-group in the present-day mountainous region of Banat during the late Modern Age, in the time of Austria-Hungary.

Political representation 

Like all other German minority groups in Romania, the Banat Highland Germans are represented by the Democratic Forum of Germans in Romania (FDGR/DFDR), more specifically by the local branch in the mountainous Banat known in German as Demokratisches Forum der Banater Berglanddeutsche.

References 

Swabia
Danube-Swabian people
Banat Swabians
Germanic ethnic groups
Romanian people of German descent
Romanian people of Austrian descent
Germany–Romania relations
Ethnic German groups in Romania
History of ethnic groups in Romania
Historical ethnic groups of Europe
History of Banat